Darth Maul: Apprentice is a short German Star Wars-based fan film, created by Shawn Bu and Vi-Dan Tran of the German-based film company, T7 Production. The film focuses around Darth Maul, a villain of the Star Wars franchise, in particular Star Wars: Episode I – The Phantom Menace. As of January  2022, it has amassed over 30 million views.

Plot
On an unknown planet, Darth Maul trains his own abilities and studies his opponents to complete his Sith training under Darth Sidious. During his training, a drone stationed in orbit around the planet reports an approaching spaceship. To remain hidden and complete his training in secret, Maul sets out to kill the intruders before they discover his hiding place and report it. It is revealed that the group consists of six Jedi. Maul swiftly kills a Jedi scout, which gains the other five Jedi's attention, and they fight him. Despite being outnumbered, Maul successfully kills the other Jedi, except for a Jedi Master and his Padawan. They manage to get the upper hand however, and Maul appears to retreat. The Jedi follow him through a canyon, but run into a trap set up by Maul. He overpowers the Padawan and kills the Jedi Master. Right when Maul is about to kill the Padawan, one of the presumed dead Jedi intervenes, and this gives enough time for the Padawan to run. Maul catches up with the Padawan in the middle of a clearing however, and they continue to duel. Maul fights her to the ground, and is hesitant on killing her, but he notices his master's camera drone around him, and kills the Padawan. Sidious appears as a hologram to Maul to express how he is pleased with Maul's achievement and declares his training complete. This is when Sidious also explains that he led the Jedi to the planet where Maul was training so he could kill them, and that it would mark "the beginning of the end for all Jedi."

Cast
 Ben Schamma as Darth Maul
 Mathis Landwehr as Jedi Master
 Svenja Jung as Jedi Apprentice
 Eskindir Tesfay as Jedi Berserker
 Maja Felicitas Bergmann as Togruta Jedi
 Paul Cless as Jedi Scout
 Sefa Demirbas as Acrobatic Jedi Knight
 Dirk Chwialkowsky as Darth Sidious
 Lee Hua as voice of Darth Sidious

Production

Filming
The filming took eighteen days in total from September 14, 2014 to November 11, 2015. Filming took place in Bollendorf, Eifel, Germany for ten days, Teufelsschlucht, Eifel, Germany for three days in March and June 2015, Brunssummerheide, Netherlands for three days in October 2015, and at a studio in Aachen, Germany for two days in December 2014 and November 2015.

Reception
Darth Maul: Apprentice has received positive reviews from critics and audiences.

Andrew Liptak of io9 praised the lightsaber battles, cinematography, and setting. Blake Rodgers of Nerdist not only praised the lightsaber battles and cinematography, but the story as well. Rick Marshall of Digital Trends praised Ben Schamma's portrayal of Maul and the makeup, but was disappointed with the runtime of the film. Ryan Downey of AltPress said, "it’s a taut, intimate, action-packed standalone story," and praised the special effects, costumes,  and the fighting choreography. Ethan Anderton of SlashFilm said the lightsaber special effects were, "...pretty well done...," and gave the fighting choreography high praise, along with the cinematography. Jeff Spry of Syfy Wire ranked the film number two on his top fourteen best Star Wars fan films list. He described the production as spectacular, and praised the lightsaber battles, choreography, and setting. Jeremy Fuster of TheWrap ranked the film number nine on his top eleven best Star Wars fan films list, and said, "...[it] features the best lightsaber fight you'll see in any fan film."

References

External links
 
 
 
 

2016 films
2016 short films
Fan films based on Star Wars
Films shot in Germany
Films shot in the Netherlands